L. polymorpha may refer to:

 Lampetis polymorpha, a jewel beetle
 Leptasterias polymorpha, a sea star
 Lomatia polymorpha, a plant native to western and southern Tasmania